Kan Jong-wook (born April, 1982) is a South Korean singer. He is a twin brother of lyricist Kan Jong-woo. They have formed a K-pop vocal duo called "J2" in 2010. He sang many K-pop songs, including original soundtracks for television series Apgujeong Midnight Sun, Royal Family, May Queen, Pink Lipstick, Bravo, My Love!, and Gloria. He has recorded more than 24 albums (OSTs + self titled singles and extended plays).

References

1982 births
Living people
South Korean male singers